Jean-Christophe Lagarde (born 24 October 1967) is a French politician serving as president of the Union of Democrats and Independents (UDI) since 2014. He succeeded Jean-Louis Borloo after a short interim by Yves Jégo. Lagarde has been the member of the National Assembly for the fifth constituency of Seine-Saint-Denis since 2002.

Political career

Career in local politics
A native of Châtellerault, Vienne, Lagarde was Mayor of Drancy from 2001 to 2017.

Career in national politics
Lagarde has been the member of the National Assembly for Seine-Saint-Denis's 5th constituency since the 2002 legislative election.

In the National Assembly, Lagarde was a member of the Committee on Legal Affairs from 2002 until 2012. He also served as one of the Assembly's vice-presidents, from 2006 until 2007 and again from 2010 until 2012.

In the 2012 presidential election, Lagarde publicly endorsed incumbent Nicolas Sarkozy. Following the legislative elections later that year, he joined the newly established UDI led by Jean-Louis Borloo and became the spokesperson of its parliamentary group. In 2013, Borloo included Lagarde in his shadow cabinet; in this capacity, Lagarde served as opposition counterpart to Minister of the Interior Manuel Valls.

In the Republicans’ 2016 presidential primaries, Lagarde and his UDI endorsed Alain Juppé as candidate for the office of President of France. When the party's majority chose François Fillon to run in the 2017 presidential election instead, Lagarde joined Fillon's campaign team. Amid the Fillon affair, he first called on the candidate to quit the election race in favour of Juppé but eventually suspended the UDI's support for the campaign altogether. Ahead of the Republicans' 2017 leadership election, he announced that the alliance between UDI and LR would end indefinitely in the event of Laurent Wauquiez becoming the party's chairman.

Since the 2017 elections, Lagarde has been serving on the Defence Committee. In addition to his committee assignments, he is a member of the French-Algerian Parliamentary Friendship Group, the French-Tunisian Parliamentary Friendship Group and the French delegation to the NATO Parliamentary Assembly.

Political positions
In 2013, Lagarde was – alongside Yves Jégo – one of two UDI members who voted against his parliamentary group's majority and instead supported the legalization of same-sex marriage in France.

In March 2019, Lagarde opposed Bruno Le Maire's proposal for a so-called GAFA tax.

References

https://www.bbc.co.uk/news/world-europe-17951859

1967 births
Living people
People from Châtellerault
Centre of Social Democrats politicians
Union for French Democracy politicians
The Centrists politicians
Democratic European Force politicians
Mayors of places in Île-de-France
Deputies of the 12th National Assembly of the French Fifth Republic
Deputies of the 13th National Assembly of the French Fifth Republic
Deputies of the 14th National Assembly of the French Fifth Republic
Deputies of the 15th National Assembly of the French Fifth Republic
Union of Democrats and Independents politicians